Anandapur is a Vidhan Sabha constituency of Kendujhar district.
Area of this constituency includes Anandapur, Hatadihi block and 14 GPs (Bailo, Baunsagarh, Belabahali, Gayalmunda, Haridapal, Jalasuan, Kantipal, Kathakata, Kodapada, Manoharpur, Panasadiha, Panchupalli, Salabani and Taratara) of Anandapur block.

Elected Members

16 elections held during 1951 to 2019. List of members elected from Anandapur Vidhan Sabha constituency are:
2019: (22): Bhagirathi Sethy (BJD)
2014: (22): Mayadhar Jena (BJD)
2009: (22): Bhagirathi Sethy (BJD)
2004: (147): Jayadev Jena (Congress)
2000: (147): Mayadhar Jena (BJP)
1995: (147): Jayadev Jena (Congress)
1990: (147): Dasarathi Jena (Janata Dal)
1985: (147): Jayadev Jena (Congress)
1980: (147): Jayadev Jena (Congress)-1
1977: (147): Makara Sethy (Janata Party)
1974: (147): Bhubanananda Jena (Congress)
1971: (132): Makara Sethy (Congress) 
1967: (132): Bhubanananda Jena (Orissa Jana Congress) 
1961: (72): Makara Sethy (Congress)
1957: (48): Upendra Jena (Ganatantra Parishad) and Birakishore Jena (Ganatantra Parishad)
1951: (42): Janardan Bhanjadeo (Independent) and Bhaiga Sethy (Independent)

Election Results

2019

2014 
In 2014 election Biju Janata Dal candidate Mayadhar Jena, defeated Indian National Congress candidate Jayadev Jena by a margin of 22,224 votes.

2009 
In 2009 election Biju Janata Dal candidate Bhagirathi Sethy, defeated Indian National Congress candidate Jayadev Jena by a margin of 23,805 votes.

Notes

References

Kendujhar district
Assembly constituencies of Odisha